Aehsun Talish is a Pakistani television director, producer, and actor. He has worked in many successful television dramas. Ahson made himself as a well-known television director by directing a number of hit serials, such as Deewana (2016), Alif Allah Aur Insaan (2017), Daldal (2017), Tabeer (2018), Suno Chanda (2018), Suno Chanda 2 (2019), and Yeh Dil Mera (2019). For directing the comedy series Suno Chanda, he received a nomination for the Lux Style Award for Best Director.

Life and career
Talish was born on 10 July 1965, in Karachi, Sindh, to Agha Ali Abbas Qizilbash, a character actor, and Umrao Jaan, a homemaker. He is married to Tasniem Talish, with whom he has a son, actor Raza Talish.

Ahson started his career in 1985 as an actor and started as a director after the death of his father, by establishing a production company in his father's name, Agha Talish Productions, in 1998. Talish has worked with many Pakistani cinema stars.

Television

 Number 26 (PTV—Actor) 
 Lunch (PTV—Director) 
 Chandpur Ka Chando (PTV—Director) 
 Chamak (PTV—Director)
 Raakh (ARY Digital—Director) 
 Hum Sub Umeed Se Hain (Geo TV—Producer and director)
 Aik Zindagi (ARY Digital—Producer) 
 Wilco (PTV—Director)
 Tohmat (Geo TV—Director)
 Na Tum Jano Na Hum Janen (Hum TV—Director)
 Neeli Chatri (ARY Digital—Producer)
 Umrao Jan-e-Aada (Geo TV—Actor)
 Aitraaf (Geo TV—Director)
 Dost (ARY Digital—Director) 
 Bina (ATV—Director)
 Mohabbat Karnay Walo Ke Naam (Hum TV—Director)
 Dil Ko Manana Aya Nahi (PTV—Director) 
 Koi To Baarish (ARY Digital—Director)
 Mere Sapnoo Ki Rani (Hum TV—Director)
 Numm (Geo TV—Director)
 Phir se Meree Qismat Likh De (Hum TV—Director)
 Takabur (A-Plus TV—Director)
 Deewana (Hum TV—Director and actor)
 Parsai (A-Plus TV—Director)
 Alif Allah Aur Insaan (Hum TV—Director)
 Daldal (Hum TV—Actor)
 Gumrah (Hum TV—Actor)
 Suno Chanda (Hum TV—Director)
 Suno Chanda 2 (Hum TV—Director)
 Tabeer (Hum TV—Directed and actor)
 Choti Choti Batain (Hum TV—Actor)
 Pyaar Kahani (Hum TV (Telefilm)—Director)
 Yeh Dil Mera (Hum TV—Director)
 Aye Musht-E-Khaak (Geo TV)

Accolades

References

Humsabki

External links
 Agha Talish Production on Facebook

Pakistani television directors
Pakistani television producers
Pakistani male television actors
1960 births
Living people